The 1998 Lipton Championships was a tennis tournament played on outdoor hard courts. It was the 14th edition of the Miami Masters and was part of the Super 9 of the 1998 ATP Tour and of Tier I of the 1998 WTA Tour. Both the men's and the women's events took place at the Tennis Center at Crandon Park in Key Biscayne, Florida in the United States from March 16 through March 29, 1998.

Finals

Men's singles

 Marcelo Ríos defeated  Andre Agassi 7–5, 6–3, 6–4
 It was Ríos' 3rd title of the year and the 9th of his career. It was his 2nd Super 9 title of the year and his 3rd overall.

Women's singles

 Venus Williams defeated  Anna Kournikova 2–6, 6–4, 6–1
 It was Williams' 4th title of the year and the 4th of her career. It was her 1st Tier I title of the year and her 1st overall.

Men's doubles

 Ellis Ferreira /  Rick Leach defeated  Alex O'Brien /  Jonathan Stark 6–2, 6–4
 It was Ferreira's 1st title of the year and the 9th of his career. It was Leach's 1st title of the year and the 35th of his career.

Women's doubles

 Martina Hingis /  Jana Novotná defeated  Arantxa Sánchez-Vicario /  Natasha Zvereva 6–2, 3–6, 6–3
 It was Hingis' 6th title of the year and the 31st of her career. It was Novotná's 2nd title of the year and the 95th of her career.

External links
 Official website
 ATP Tournament Profile
 WTA Tournament Profile

 
Lipton Championships
Lipton Championships
Miami Open (tennis)
Lipton Championships
Lipton Championships
Lipton Championships